Filippo Grandi (born March 30, 1957) is an Italian diplomat and United Nations official, currently serving as United Nations High Commissioner for Refugees. He previously served as Commissioner-General of the United Nations Relief and Works Agency for Palestine Refugees in the Near East (UNRWA) and United Nations Deputy Special Representative for Afghanistan.

Education
Grandi graduated with a degree in modern history from the University of Milan in 1981, and with a bachelor's degree in philosophy from the Gregorian University in Rome in 1987.

Career
Grandi started his career in the office of the United Nations High Commissioner for Refugees (UNHCR) in 1988, and has served in a variety of countries, including Sudan, Syria, Turkey, and Iraq after the first Gulf War. He also headed a number of emergency operations including in Kenya, Benin, Ghana, Liberia, the Great Lakes Region of Central Africa, Yemen and Afghanistan. Between 1996 and 1997, he was Field Coordinator for UNHCR and United Nations humanitarian activities in the Democratic Republic of Congo during the civil war. From 1997 to 2001, he worked in the Executive Office of the UNHCR in Geneva, as Special Assistant and then Chief of Staff. From 2001 to 2004, he served as the UNHCR's Chief of Mission.

Grandi then moved to the United Nations Assistance Mission in Afghanistan (UNAMA) in 2004, where he served as Deputy Special Representative of the Secretary-General responsible for political affairs from 2004 to 2005. In 2005 he moved to UNRWA, first as Deputy Commissioner-General and then from 2010 as Commissioner-General until 29 March 2014.

On 11 November 2015 UN Secretary-General Ban Ki-moon announced his intention to appoint Grandi as the next United Nations High Commissioner for Refugees to take office in 2016. On 23 November 2020, the United Nations General Assembly re-elected Grandi for an additional 2.5 year mandate as High Commissioner for Refugees.

Since 2019, Grandi has been a member of the World Economic Forum High-Level Group on Humanitarian Investing, co-chaired by Børge Brende, Kristalina Georgieva and Peter Maurer.

Other activities
 Joint United Nations Programme on HIV/AIDS (UNAIDS), Ex-Officio Member of the Committee of Cosponsoring Organizations (since 2016)
 International Gender Champions (IGC), Member
 Paris School of International Affairs (PSIA), Member of the Strategic Committee
 World Economic Forum (WEF), Member of the Global Future Council on the Future of the Humanitarian System

See also
 List of Directors and Commissioners-General of the United Nations Relief and Works Agency for Palestine Refugees in the Near East

References

External links
 UN Biography, Filippo Grandi
 Filippo Grandi, UNHCR

Living people
UNRWA officials
Diplomats from Milan
United Nations High Commissioners for Refugees
Pontifical Gregorian University alumni
University of Milan alumni
1957 births
Italian officials of the United Nations